The Let L-33 Solo is a Czech shoulder-wing, single-seat, glider, designed by Marian Meciar and Vaclav Zajic, and produced by Let Kunovice. The L-33 first flew in 1992 and remained in production through 2012, supplied as a ready-to-fly aircraft.

Design and development
The L-33 was a developed as the single-seat "natural step" for early solo students to fly after dual training on the two-seat LET L-23 Super Blaník. The L-33 features a cantilever wing, a T-tail, a single-seat enclosed  cockpit under a bubble canopy and fixed monowheel gear.

The semi-monocoque design is made from flush riveted aluminum sheet. The rudder is covered with doped aircraft fabric. Its  span, semi-tapered wing employs a Wortmann FX-60-17A11-182 airfoil at the wing root, transitioning to an FX-60-126 at the wing tip.

The L-33 was a competitor in the IGC World Class sailplane design competition, but lost to the Polish Politechnika Warszawska PW-5. The design is type certified to JAR 22 in Argentina, Canada, the Czech Republic, Germany, Hungary, Japan, the United Kingdom and the United States.

Operational history
By November 2012, 92 examples had been produced. In December 2012, 49 examples had been registered with the Federal Aviation Administration in the United States, 12 with Transport Canada and one with the British Civil Aviation Authority.

Specifications (L-33 Solo)

See also

References

External links

Official website

1990s Czech and Czechoslovakian sailplanes
L-33
Aircraft first flown in 1992
Shoulder-wing aircraft
T-tail aircraft